Nea Petra is a village in the Serres regional unit of Central Macedonia, Greece. Nea Petra is located around 23 km south east of the city of Serres.

History 

According to the Ethnological Museum of Thrace, Greeks from Kayali settled in Nea Petra. During the Balkan Wars, Bulgaria annexed the village until 1913. Before 1927 Nea Petra was called Tsianos.

Babo/Vrexoudia tradition 

Ever since 1923, on the 8th of January, a tradition takes place in Nea Petra called Babo or Vrexoudia. According to this tradition, women take over the village and force the men to do the home chores. During the Vrexoudia tradition on the same day, women actively provoke water fights with the men of the village. The 8th of January is also called the day of Gynecocracy in Nea Petra due to this tradition.

Population

Notable people 

Michalis Tzelepis, MP of ΠΑΣΟΚ

References 

Populated places in Serres (regional unit)
Villages in Greece